Psilocybe wayanadensis is a species of mushroom in the family Hymenogastraceae. The mushroom contains psilocybin, a prodrug for the psychedelic tryptamine psilocin.

It was described from the state of Kerala in India.

See also
List of Psilocybin mushrooms
Psilocybin mushrooms
Psilocybe
Original species description

References

Entheogens
Psychoactive fungi
wayanadensis
Psychedelic tryptamine carriers
Fungi of India
Fungi described in 2002
Taxa named by Gastón Guzmán